Midland is an unincorporated community in Wright Township, Greene County, Indiana.

Midland was platted in 1901.

Geography

References

Unincorporated communities in Greene County, Indiana
Unincorporated communities in Indiana
Bloomington metropolitan area, Indiana
1901 establishments in Indiana
Populated places established in 1901